In mathematics the monomial basis of a polynomial ring is its basis (as a vector space or free module over the field or ring of coefficients) that consists of all monomials. The monomials form a basis because every polynomial may be uniquely written as a finite linear combination of monomials (this is an immediate consequence of the definition of a polynomial).

One indeterminate

The polynomial ring  of univariate polynomials over a field  is a -vector space, which has 

as an (infinite) basis. More generally, if  is a ring then  is a free module which has the same basis.

The polynomials of degree at most  form also a vector space (or a free module in the case of a ring of coefficients), which has  as a basis.

The canonical form of a polynomial is its expression on this basis:

or, using the shorter sigma notation:

The monomial basis is naturally totally ordered, either by increasing degrees

or by decreasing degrees

Several indeterminates

In the case of several indeterminates  a monomial is a product

As  an exponent equal to zero means that the corresponding indeterminate does not appear in the monomial; in particular  is a monomial.

Similar to the case of univariate polynomials, the polynomials in  form a vector space (if the coefficients belong to a field) or a free module (if the coefficients belong to a ring), which has the set of all monomials as a basis, called the monomial basis.

The homogeneous polynomials of degree  form a subspace which has the monomials of degree  as a basis. The dimension of this subspace is the number of monomials of degree , which is 

where  is a binomial coefficient.

The polynomials of degree at most  form also a subspace, which has the monomials of degree at most  as a basis. The number of these monomials is the dimension of this subspace, equal to

In contrast to the univariate case, there is no natural total order of the monomial basis in the multivariate case. For problems which require choosing a total order, such as Gröbner basis computations, one generally chooses an admissible monomial order – that is, a total order on the set of monomials such that

See also
Horner's method
Polynomial sequence
Newton polynomial
Lagrange polynomial
Legendre polynomial
Bernstein form
Chebyshev form

Algebra
Polynomials